Peeter Süda ( in Viki, Saare County – 3 August 1920 in Tallinn) was a father of the Estonian organ school, composer and an early collector of Estonian folksongs.

He studied at the Saint Petersburg Conservatory from 1902 to 1912. His organ teachers were Louis Homilius and Jacob Handschin, his composition professors included Anatoly Lyadov, Alexander Glazunov, Jāzeps Vītols and Nicolai Soloviev. After graduation, he worked as an organist and piano teacher in Tallinn.

Works
His works consist mainly of polyphonic organ music, sometimes with folk influences. He also wrote a choral fugue, "The Flax Puller".
 Prelude and Fugue in G minor

Influence
The Peeter Süda Memorial Foundation was established in 1924, eventually becoming the Estonian Theatre and Music Museum was set up. The museum regards the "heart" of Estonian Theatre and Music Museum."

Recordings
 on Baltic organ music BIS
 Complete works. EMIC, 2005

References

1883 births
1920 deaths
People from Saaremaa Parish
People from the Governorate of Livonia
Estonian folk-song collectors
Estonian classical organists
Male classical organists
Saint Petersburg Conservatory alumni
20th-century organists
20th-century Estonian composers
20th-century male musicians
19th-century musicologists